Gençali is a Turkish place name and it may refer to

Gençali, Dinar a village in Dinar district of Afyonkarahisar Province 
Gençali, Ayaş a village in Ayaş district of Ankara Province
Gençali, Polatlı a village in Polatlı district of Ankara Province
Gençali, Bartın a village in the central district of Bartın Province
Gençali, Mut a village in Mut district of Mersin Province
Gençali, Yeşilova